T25 may refer to:

Automobiles 
 T.25, a city car
 Cooper T25, a sports car
 Volkswagen T25, a van

Other uses 
 
 Ritsurin Station, in Takamatsu, Kagawa, Japan
 T25 Medium Tank, an American tank
 Tanimachi Kyūchōme Station, in Tennōji-ku, Osaka, Japan